First-seeded Helen Wills defeated Kathleen McKane Godfree 3–6, 6–0, 6–2 in the final to win the women's singles tennis title at the 1925 U.S. National Championships. The event was held at the West Side Tennis Club, Forest Hills, New York City. It was Wills's third consecutive U.S. National singles title.

Draw

Final eight

References

1925
1925 in women's tennis
1925 in American women's sports
Women's Singles
1925 in New York City
1925 in sports in New York (state)
Women's sports in New York (state)